RMS Caledonia was a British ocean liner built by Alexander Stephen and Sons for the Anchor Line which was converted into an armed merchant cruiser during World War II.

History

Passenger Service
The ship was ordered by the Anchor Line from Alexander Stephen and Sons. She was laid down in February 1920 and launched on 21 April 1925. Her sister ships were the SS California and the RMS Transylvania. On 3 October 1925, she departed on her maiden voyage on the Glasgow to New York route. In March 1936 the ship's accommodation was changed from first, second, and third-class to the cabin, tourist, and third class. in 1938 the ship has remodeled of the 3rd class accommodation, new propellers, and a speed of 17 knots.

World War 2
In September 1939, the liner was decommissioned from passenger service and requisitioned by the Royal Navy as an armed merchant cruiser and was renamed as the HMS Scotstoun. She was credited with capturing the 6386-ton German tanker Biscaya off Reykjavík on 19 October 1939 and, in company with sister ship HMS Transylvania, sinking the 5864-ton German freighter  Poseidon two days later.

Citations 

 

Ocean liners
World War II Auxiliary cruisers of the Royal Navy
Ships sunk by German submarines in World War II
1925 ships
Maritime incidents in June 1940
World War II shipwrecks in the Atlantic Ocean
Ships built on the River Clyde